Wesley Greenidge (born 6 July 1998) is a British judoka.

Judo career
Greenidge is twice a champion of Great Britain, winning the heavyweight (+100kg) division at the British Judo Championships in 2021 and 2022.

In 2022, he won the bronze medal at the Senior European Cup in Sarajevo.

References

1998 births
Living people
British male judoka